Sir Lionel Tollemache, 2nd Baronet (2 August 1591 – 6 September 1640) PC, of Helmingham Hall in Suffolk, was twice elected as a Member of Parliament for Orford in Suffolk, in 1621 and 1628. He had a considerable reputation as a surgeon, but is said to have made many enemies due to his "immoderate temper".

Origins
He was born on 2 August 1591, the son and heir of Sir Lionel Tollemache, 1st Baronet (1562–1612) of Helmingham, and Katharine Cromwell, daughter of Henry Cromwell, 2nd Baron Cromwell and Mary Paulet.

Career
He was knighted at the Palace of Whitehall on 15 November 1612 and succeeded to the baronetcy and estate of Helmingham on the death of his father in 1612. In 1621 he was elected a Member of Parliament for Orford in Suffolk. He was a Privy Councillor to King James I and Charles I. In 1628 he was elected an MP for Orford again and sat until 1629 when King Charles embarked on his period of Personal Rule without parliament for eleven years.

Marriage and children

In about 1620 he married Elizabeth Stanhope, a daughter of John Stanhope, 1st Baron Stanhope of Harrington (by his second wife Margaret McWilliams), by whom he had a son and six daughters, including:
Sir Lionel Tollemache, 3rd Baronet (1624–1669), son and heir;
Jane Tollemache, who married Thomas Cholmondeley (b. 1627); 
Elizabeth Tollemache, who married firstly William Alington, 1st Baron Alington, and secondly Sir William Compton, Master of the Ordnance (died 1663); 
Anne Tollemache, who  married Sir Robert Broke, 1st Baronet.
Catherine Tollemache, who married Charles Mordaunt, 3rd Baronet
Susannah Tollemache, who married Sir Henry Felton, 2nd Baronet

Death and burial
Tollemache died suddenly at Tilbury in Essex on 6 September 1640, in his 49th year, and was buried in St Mary's Church, Helmingham, where survives his  mural monument with semi-recumbent effigy, commenced by his father and completed by himself.

Notes

References

External links
 St Mary's church Helmingham Suffolk Tollemache memorial
 TOLLEMACHE (TALMASH), Sir Lionel, 2nd Bt. (1591-1640), of Helmingham Hall, Suff.; Brunt Hall, Great Fakenham, Suff. and Charing Cross, Westminster In Thrush, Andrew; Ferris, John P. (eds.). The History of Parliament: the House of Commons 1604–1629.

 

1591 births
1640 deaths
English MPs 1621–1622
English MPs 1628–1629
Members of the Privy Council of England
Baronets in the Baronetage of England
Lionel Tollemache, 2nd Baronet of Helmingham
People from Mid Suffolk District